Diospage semimarginata is a moth of the subfamily Arctiinae. It was described by Rothschild in 1909. It is found in Ecuador.

References

Euchromiina
Moths described in 1909